is a lighthouse located  on Cape Shionomisaki,on the southern coast of Kii Peninsula in the Kansai region of Japan. Administratively, it is within the town of Kushimoto, Wakayama Prefecture.

History
On June 25, 1866, the Tokugawa shogunate of Edo period Japan signed a customs and tax treaty with the United States, Great Britain, France, and the Netherlands to normalize trade relations, One of the stipulations of this treaty was that eight lighthouses be erected near the approaches to the treaty ports opened for foreign commerce.(Kannonzaki, Nojimasaki, Kashinozaki, Mikomotojima, Kusaki, Iojima, Cape Sata, and Shionomisaki). However, due to the Boshin War, work was not begun until after the Meiji restoration. The new Meiji government brought in foreign advisors to assist in the modernization efforts, one of whom was the British engineer Richard Henry Brunton who specialized in lighthouse design. Aside from the eight lighthouses stipulated by the treaty (i.e. the "treaty lighthouses"), Brunton went on to constructed another 25 lighthouses from far northern Hokkaidō to southern Kyūshū during his career in Japan.

Work on the Shionomisaki Lighthouse began in June 1870, and it was first lit on June 10, 1870 with a temporary lighting system. The original structure was a octagonal wooden building, and it was to have been the first western-style wooden lighthouse in Japan; however, the ship containing the light mechanism from the United Kingdom sank in the East China Sea en route to Japan, and Brunton was forced to improvise using the lantern from a steam locomotive instead. The main lighting equipment was repeatedly delayed, and it was not until September 15, 1873 that its intended light system was installed and declared operational. 

The lighthouse was rebuilt in April 1878 with the current stone structure. In 1929, the lighting system was replaced with a second-class Fresnel immovable lens and an oil-evaporated incandescent lamp, and the system was electrified in 1938. This lamp was replaced with a 90-cm rotary lamp in 1957.

The lighthouse is within the borders of the Yoshino-Kumano National Park. The lighthouse is now operated by the Japan Coast Guard 5th Regional Headquarters

Gallery

See also

 List of lighthouses in Japan

References

External links

Kushimoto Tourist Information
Wakayama Prefecture official tourist information site
Kushimoto Official home page

Lighthouses completed in 1873
Lighthouses in Japan
Buildings and structures in Wakayama Prefecture
Kushimoto, Wakayama